Jennet Saryyeva (born 30 March 1994 in Ashgabat) is a Turkmenistan swimmer. At the 2012 Summer Olympics, she competed in the Women's 400 metre freestyle, finishing in 35th (last) place in the heats; her time of 5:40.29 was nearly a minute behind that the next slowest competitor, but set a new Turkmenistan record.

References

Turkmenistan female swimmers
1994 births
Living people
Olympic swimmers of Turkmenistan
Swimmers at the 2012 Summer Olympics
Turkmenistan female freestyle swimmers
Swimmers at the 2010 Summer Youth Olympics
Swimmers at the 2010 Asian Games
Sportspeople from Ashgabat
Asian Games competitors for Turkmenistan